Tuat, or Touat, is a natural region of desert in central Algeria that contains a string of small oases. In the past, the oases were important for caravans crossing the Sahara.

Geography
Tuat lies to the south of the Grand Erg Occidental, to the east of the Erg Chech and to the south west of the Tademaït Plateau. It contains a string of small oases strung out along the eastern edge of the Wadi Messaoud, a continuation of the Wadi Saoura. The oases extend over a distance of 160 km from the district of Bouda in the north to Reggane in the south. The largest town in the region is Adrar, 20 km south east of Bouda. Adrar was established by the French after their conquest in 1900 and had a population of 43,903 in 2002. Associated with each oasis are small walled villages called ksour (singular ksar or gsar). There are also some forts (kasbahs), most of which have been abandoned.

There is almost no rainfall in the region and the agriculture depends on groundwater from the Continental Intercalary, an enormous aquifer that extends for over 600,000 km2, an area that includes parts of Algeria, Libya and Tunisia. The Continental Intercalary is a layer of porous sandstone deposited between the Moscovian and the Cenomanian periods. It forms the deeper of the two aquifers of the North Western Sahara Aquifer System (NWSAS). Tuat is situated at the south western boundary of the Continental Intercalary where the aquifer lies only 2–6 m below the surface.

The oases contain 700,000-800,000 date palms (Phoenix dactylifera) in an area of  4,500 hectare. The palm groves are irrigated by a system of foggaras. These are traditional gravity catchment systems which consist of a tunnel constructed with a gentle uphill gradient from the low ground near the wadi into the aquifer lying under the nearby higher ground. Vertical access holes every 10–20 m along the tunnel provide ventilation and facilitate the construction and maintenance. Many of the foggaras are over a kilometre in length. They typically provide flow rates of between 2 L/s and 3 L/s. In 1963 the region of Tuat contained 531 foggaras of which only 358 were functioning. The total combined flow rate was approximately 2000 L/s. Foggaras are expensive to construct and to maintain. As they collapse they are often not repaired. Instead, water is obtained using vertical wells and electric pumps allowing grain to be grown using a center pivot irrigation system. A single well can provide 30 L/s to 50 L/s of water.

In addition to water, the rock beneath Tuat contains pockets of natural gas. Sonatrach, the Algeria state-owned oil company, is collaborating with foreign companies in joint ventures to exploit these gas reserves. Sonatrach and the China National Oil & Gas Exploration & Development Corporation (CNODC) have constructed a refinery near the village of Sbaa, 40 km north of Adrar. This began operating in 2006. Separate projects led by Gaz de France (GDF Suez) and Total are both scheduled to start supplying gas in 2013. A pipeline is being built to connect to Hassi R'Mel.

To the north of Tuat is Gourara, a similar region also containing oases with date palms irrigated by foggaras. The largest town, Timimoun, is 162 km north east of Adrar.

History
The Tuat oases were important in the trans-Saharan trade because of their location at the northern end of the Tanezrouft route. Reggane is around 1150 km north of the town of Gao and a similar distance from Timbuktu. Caravans from the Sudan would continue northwards to towns such as Sijilmasa or Tlemcen.

The oases are not mentioned by any of the early Arabic geographers, but it appears that Jews lived in the oases at an early date as a tombstone discovered in a village of the Bouda region has an inscription in Hebrew with a date of 1329.

The earliest written reference to Tuat is by Ibn Battuta. He visited Bouda in 1353 after crossing the Sahara from Takedda in present-day Niger, a distance of 1390 km. He travelled with a large caravan that included 600 slave girls. He wrote: "Then we arrived at Būda, which is one of the biggest villages of the Tuwāt. Its land consists of sand and salt pans. It has many dates which are not good, but its people prefer them to the dates of Sijilmāsa. There is no cultivation there nor butter nor oil. Oil is only imported to it from the land of the Maghrib. The food of its people is dates and locusts. These are abundant with them; they store them as dates are stored and use them for food. They go out to hunt them before sunrise, for at that time they do not fly on account of the cold." Ibn Battuta stayed in Bouda for a few days and then continued on to Sijilmasa with a caravan.

Bouda, as well as Sijilmasa, Timbuktu and Gao, are marked on the 1375 Catalan Atlas of Abraham Cresques. At some point Bouda was abandoned and replaced by Tamentit as the main ksour of the region. Tamentit was more centrally situated and perhaps easier to defend. The Arabic geographer and historian Ibn Khaldun (born Tunis 1332, died Egypt 1406) provides a description of Tuat, a place he had not visited himself, in his Kitab al-'Ibar:
One of their homelands lies three stages to the south of Sijilmāsa and is called Tuwāt. It consists of 200 qușūr strung out from west to east, of which the most easterly is called Tamanțīt, nowadays a flourishing place and a point of departure for merchants who pass to and fro between the Maghrib and the land of Māli of the Sūdān. ... The town of Būdā, the most westerly of these qușūr, used to be the point of departure for Wālātan, the outpost of the Mālī territory, but it was abandoned when the bedouin Arabs from the desert of the Sūs took to acts of brigandry on the highway and molesting the caravans. They left that place and followed the route to the land of the Sudān by way of Tamanțīt.

Note that in reality Adrar is 540 km southeast of Sijilmasa, considerably more than the three stages mentioned by Ibn Khaldun. Also, the oases are strung out from north-northwest to south-southeast rather than from west to east.

We learn more about Tuat from a letter written in Latin in 1447 by the Italian Antonio Malfante from 'Tueto' to a merchant in Genoa. Malfante describes a village which is believed to be Tamentit: "This locality is a mart of the country of the Moors, to which merchants come to sell their goods: gold is carried hither, and bought by those who come up from the coast. This place is De Amament [Tamentit], and there are many rich men here. The generality, however, are very poor, for they do not sow, nor do they harvest anything, save the dates upon which they subsist. They eat no meat but that of castrated camels, which are scarce and very dear." He also comments on the Jewish population: "There are many Jews, who lead a good life here, for they are under the protection of the several rulers, each of whom defends his own clients. Thus they enjoy very secure social standing. Trade is in their hands, and many of them are to be trusted with the greatest confidence."

The Sultan of the Ziyyanid dynasty of Tlemcen , Abu Hammu II (1359-1389) took refuge in the Gourara region where he was well received. The sultan stayed there a while before reconquering Tlemcen from the Merinids in a ksar near a sebkha in Timimoun (dubbed «Capital of the Gourara»), the ksar in question still bears the sultan's name, Tal n Hammu. Through tribal alliances, the Ziyyanids had a certain influence over the Touat.

From the start of the 15th century, political relations between the region were established with the Kingdom of Tlemcen. According to a Touati source, quoted by Alfred Georges Paul Martin, a French officer of the Legion of Honour, a text written by a certain al-Amuri recites a conflict in 1435 opposing a group of nomades (Ouled Ali Ibn Hariz) and the Jews of Tamantit. The nomades bought some dates on credit and refused to pay for them, the Jews of Tamantit called upon the sultan of Tlemcen, Abū l-‘Abbās Aḥmad al-‘Akil (1430-1466), the sultan sent a small expedition in order to end the conflict.

Around 1490, encouraged by Muhammad al-Maghili, a Maliki scholar from Tlemcen, the Moslem population of Tamentit destroyed the Jewish synagogue and forced the Jews to move elsewhere.

Sometime between 1583 and 1588 the forces of the Moroccan sultan Ahmad al-Mansur took control of the Tuat and the Gourara oases.  The area remained politically dependent upon Morocco but the sovereignty of the Alaouite
sultans became almost nominal.

Following the expeditions of the tribes of Taflilelt in the Touat region, the dignitaries of the oasis implored the intervention of the Dey of Algiers. The Dey wrote letters threatening the nomades and sent an expedition that arrived a year later in 1579, the troops sent by the Dey of Algiers established themselves in the ruins of Tiberchrine, sending reconnaissance unites to other oases. Then it returned north. The Touat-Gourara called upon the bey of Algiers since Tlemcen had been annexed by the regency of Algiers, the dignitaries of the oases knew to which authority they should address.

Prior to 1830, Touat paid tribute to the Dey of Algiers.

In the 1890s, the French administration and military called for the annexation of the Touat, the Gourara and the Tidikelt, a complex that had been part of the Moroccan Empire for many centuries prior to the arrival of the French in Algeria. However, according to Alfred Le Chatelier, French soldier, ceramicist and Islamologist, Touat, at any moment of history, had not been part of Morocco. The rulers of Fez and of Marrakech never effectively took control of Touat, the inhabitants never depended of them more than a few years. In every occasion they would affirm their independence and free themselves of any religious vassalage.

An armed conflict opposed French 19th Corps Oran and Algiers divisions to the Aït Khabbash, a fraction of the Aït Ounbgui khams of the Aït Atta confederation. The conflict ended by the annexation of the Touat-Gourara-Tidikelt complex to Algeria by France in 1901.

Under French rule, the area was known as the "Territoire des oasis sahariennes". During 1903, attacks on the lines of communication by local tribes caused the French troops to suffer serious losses. To punish the tribes the town of Figuig was bombarded by the French on 8 June. On the following 2 September a band of nomads attacked the escort of a convoy going to Taghit at a place called El Mungar. After maintaining the fight for over seven hours the French were reinforced and their attackers drew off. Out of 115 combatants the French lost 38 killed and 47 wounded. To consolidate their position the French authorities determined to connect the oases with the Algerian Sahara proper by carriage roads and railways.

See also
 Taznatit language

Notes

References
.
.
.
. Google Preview.
.
.
. Google: Preview.
.
.
. First published in 1981.
. 
. 
.

Further reading
.
.
.
.
.
.

External links

 Les Zénètes du Gourara d’hier à aujourd’hui  About the Gourara region which lies to the north of Tuat.

Geography of Algeria
Natural regions of Africa
Historic Jewish communities in North Africa
Jews and Judaism in Algeria